William Ravenscroft (1561 – 27 October 1628) was an English politician who sat in the House of Commons at various times between 1586 and 1628.

Ravenscroft was the son of George Ravenscroft. He was educated at Brasenose College, Oxford in 1578, aged 17 and was awarded BA in 1580. He entered Lincoln's Inn in 1580.

In 1586, he was elected Member of Parliament for Flintshire. He was called to the bar in 1589.  In 1597 he was elected again as MP for Flintshire. He became Clerk of the Petty Bag for life in 1598. In 1601 he was re-elected MP for Flintshire. He was elected MP for Old Sarum in 1604 and 1614. In 1621 he was elected MP for  Flint. He became associate bencher and treasurer of Lincoln's Inn in 1621 and became  master of the library in 1624. In 1624 he was re-elected MP for Flint. He was elected MP for Flint again in 1625 and 1628.

Ravenscroft died unmarried at the age of about 67.

References

 
 

1561 births
1628 deaths
Members of the Parliament of England (pre-1707) for constituencies in Wales
Members of Lincoln's Inn
Alumni of Brasenose College, Oxford
English MPs 1586–1587
English MPs 1597–1598
English MPs 1601
English MPs 1604–1611
English MPs 1614
English MPs 1621–1622
English MPs 1624–1625
English MPs 1625
English MPs 1628–1629